Anni Milja Maaria Sinnemäki (born 20 July 1973) is a Finnish politician and a member of the Finnish Parliament between 1999 and 2015, representing the Green League.

Biography 
She was first elected to the parliament in 1999 and served as the Minister of Labour from 2009 to 2011. She was elected chairwoman of the Green League on 16 May 2009 and sought a second term in 2011, but lost to Ville Niinistö in a party election. She has been a member of the city council of Helsinki since 2004. She is also known for her poetry.

Sinnemäki was born in Helsinki, Finland. She has a B.A. degree in Russian literature from the University of Helsinki. Her daughter, Siiri, was born in 1990, when Sinnemäki was sixteen. Sinnemäki is the author of a series of Finnish pop lyrics of the 1990s and early 2000s for the band Ultra Bra. She was married to the founder of the band, Kerkko Koskinen, from 1996 to 2001. She married Anton Monti in 2012 and they have a son, Rufus, born in 2012.

Sinnemäki has stated that her greatest disappointment in her political career is the decision on nuclear power in 2002. On the other hand, the law on civil partnerships was the biggest victory of her political career.

Sinnemäki has defended the raising of development aid to 0.7% of GDP in parliament budget negotiations. She has also defended public transportation, municipal funding and funding for the treatment of prisoners.

Sinnemäki left the parliament in 2015, after she was elected Deputy Mayor of Helsinki.

References

External links

The official website of Anni Sinnemäki 

1973 births
Living people
Politicians from Helsinki
Green League politicians
Ministers of Labour of Finland
Members of the Parliament of Finland (1999–2003)
Members of the Parliament of Finland (2003–07)
Members of the Parliament of Finland (2007–11)
Members of the Parliament of Finland (2011–15)
Women government ministers of Finland
21st-century Finnish women politicians
Women members of the Parliament of Finland
University of Helsinki alumni